This is a list of Cartoon Network films.

Animated films

Live-action films

Notes

See also 

 List of programs broadcast by Cartoon Network
 Cartoon Network Studios productions

References 

Films
Lists of American animated films
Lists of television films
Films